Six ships of the French navy have borne the name Annibal in honour of Hannibal

French ship named Annibal 
 Annibal (1707), an unbuilt ship of the line (?)
  (1779–1794), a 74-gun ship of the line, lead ship of 
 Annibal (1782–1787), a captured British 52-gun ship
 Annibal (1795–1796), a gunboat
 Annibal (1801–1823), a captured British 74-gun ship of the line

See also 
 HMS Hannibal
 USS Hannibal

Notes and references

Notes

References

Bibliography 
 
 

French Navy ship names
Napoleonic-era ships